The Tony Award for Best Stage Technician was awarded to acknowledge the contributions of stage technicians in both musicals and plays. The award was first given in 1948 and last presented in 1963.

Winners and nominees

1940s

1950s

1960s

External links
 Tony Awards Official site
 Tony Awards at Internet Broadway database Listing
 Tony Awards at broadwayworld.com

Tony Awards
Stagecraft
Awards established in 1948
1963 disestablishments in the United States
1948 establishments in the United States
Awards disestablished in 1963